Steatomys is a genus of rodent in the family Nesomyidae. 
It contains the following species:
 Bocage's African fat mouse (Steatomys bocagei)
 Northwestern fat mouse (Steatomys caurinus)
 Dainty fat mouse (Steatomys cuppedius)
 Jackson's fat mouse (Steatomys jacksoni)
 Krebs's fat mouse (Steatomys krebsii)
 Pousargues African fat mouse (Steatomys opimus)
 Tiny fat mouse (Steatomys parvus)
 Fat mouse (Steatomys pratensis)

References

 
Rodent genera
Taxa named by Wilhelm Peters
Taxonomy articles created by Polbot